The Cairoli III government of Italy held office from 25 November 1879 until 29 May 1881, a total of 551 days, or 1 year, 6 months and 4 days.

Government parties
The government was composed by the following parties:

Composition

References

Italian governments
1879 establishments in Italy
1881 establishments in Italy